Nathan "Nate" Bourdeau (born August 10, 1990 in Baldwinsville, New York) is a professional American soccer player who currently plays for Utica City FC in the Major Arena Soccer League.

College and amateur
Nathan attended Baldwinsville High School where he is the schools all-time leader in goals and assists. Bourdeau was a 6-year member of Region 1 ODP team and a U-18 US National team member.

He played college soccer at Boston College in 2008, where he was part of a top 15 recruiting class, according to ESPN.com  before transferring to Rutgers University in his sophomore year. While at Rutgers University, Bourdeau was named team MVP, All-Big East team and captain while leading them to a sweet 16.

Professional
Since graduating college, Bourdeau has played for indoor side Utica City FC, who were known as the Syracuse Silver Knights until 2018–19. In 2015, he was part of a Rochester Rhinos team that went on to win the USL championship vs. LA Galaxy II. 

On February 13, 2021, Bordeau joined Florida Tropics SC for the remainder of the 2020-21 Major Arena Soccer League season, after Utica City FC elected to sit out.

References

1990 births
Living people
American soccer players
Boston College Eagles men's soccer players
Rochester New York FC players
Rutgers Scarlet Knights men's soccer players
Syracuse Silver Knights players
Soccer players from New York (state)
Association football midfielders
USL Championship players
Major Arena Soccer League players
National Premier Soccer League players
United States men's youth international soccer players
Utica City FC players
Florida Tropics SC players
People from Baldwinsville, New York